Dewe may refer to:
 Dewe (woreda), a district in the Afar Region of Ethiopia
 Mount Dewe, a mountain in Antarctica

People
 , German sociologist
 Colleen Dewe, New Zealand politician
 Déwé Gorodey, New Caledonian teacher, writer, and politician

See also
 Dew (disambiguation)
 Dewey (disambiguation)
 Deve (disambiguation)
 Diu (disambiguation)
 Dewes, a list of people with the surname